Absolute Proof is a 2021 political propaganda film directed by and starring Mike Lindell. It was distributed by One America News Network and promotes the conspiracy theory that Donald Trump won the 2020 presidential election instead of Joe Biden. The documentary was removed by video hosting sites YouTube and Vimeo for violating their community standards.

Absolute Proof won two awards: the Golden Raspberry Award for Worst Picture and the Golden Raspberry Award for Worst Actor (for Lindell). Lindell has since released three sequels: Scientific Proof, Absolute Interference, and Absolutely 9-0.

Premise 

In the documentary, Lindell hosts numerous cybersecurity experts and anonymous persons whose testimonies allegedly support his claim that Chinese and Iranian hackers hacked into voting machines and switched votes from Trump to Biden on Election Day.

Participants 

Mike Lindell
Brannon Howse
Mary Fanning
Phil Waldron
Matthew DePerno

Background 
On November 7, 2020, Joe Biden was declared the winner of the 2020 U.S. Presidential election by most major news organizations. Alleging that voter fraud switched several million votes for Joe Biden, Trump's campaign and Republican allies challenged the election results. At least 63 lawsuits were filed, although none were successful. Trump and his allies unsuccessfully urged officials in states that Biden won to disqualify some ballots and to challenge vote certification processes. Even after Biden was inaugurated as the 46th President of the United States on January 20, 2021, Trump and others, including Lindell, continued to maintain that Trump had actually won the election.

Release 
On February 5, 2021, One America News Network live streamed the film on its website. Introduced with a disclaimer, the film shortly afterward went viral. Several hours after the live stream, YouTube and Vimeo removed all recordings of the film from their sites, citing violations of their community standards, but not before it had tens of thousands of views.

Reception 
The film was widely criticized by fact-checkers as being full of "debunked, unsubstantial claims." Mainstream news outlets such as The New York Times disputed its claims as well.

Lindell's staff confirmed in August 2021 that the data shown in the film was given to Lindell by Dennis L. Montgomery, a software designer with a documented history of fraud.

Awards 
In April 2021, Absolute Proof received two Golden Raspberry Awards, which parody traditional awards by honoring a year's worst films.

Sequels 
Over the next several months, Lindell released Scientific Proof, an hour-long interview with Douglas G. Frank; Absolute Interference, a two-hour-long documentary starring Michael Flynn, which The Dispatch fact check says "recycles many familiar voter fraud claims that lack evidence"; and Absolutely 9-0, a 26-minute-long interview with an anonymous "white hat hacker" who purported to show packet captures from voting machines used in the 2020 election. In reality, the data presented was a hex-encoded version of publicly available voter registration data from Pennsylvania.

"Cyber Symposium" 
On August 10, 11, and 12, 2021, Lindell hosted a "cyber symposium" in Sioux Falls, South Dakota, which he promised would produce "irrefutable evidence" for his claims that the election had been stolen by foreign hackers. However, the cyber expert he had hired to analyze his evidence said he could not confirm that claim. Lindell promised to make the purported packet captures available to attendees and offered a $5 million "bounty" to any attendee who could prove that they did not originate from the 2020 election. Just as the symposium was about to start on August 10, Lindell's website, LindellTV, was inoperative for about an hour – a problem Lindell says, without providing proof, was the result of a hack. Lindell had predicted that because of the irrefutable evidence his symposium would reveal, Trump would be recognized as the true winner of the 2020 election and reinstated as president on August 13, the day after his symposium ended. When that did not occur, he moved the predicted date of Trump's reinstatement to September 13, which also did not result in Trump being reinstated. The packet captures were never presented at the symposium and one attendee described Lindell's supposed evidence as "random garbage that wastes our time". Renowned election cybersecurity expert Harri Hursti, who attended the symposium, characterized the data presented as "a big fat nothing and a distraction".

References

External links 
 
 Absolute Proof on MUBI

2021 films
Films about the 2020 United States presidential election
Conspiracist media
Conspiracy theories in the United States
Documentary films about conspiracy theories
Golden Raspberry Award winning films
Conspiracy theories promoted by Donald Trump
2021 documentary films
American documentary films
Propaganda in the United States
2020s English-language films
2020s American films